Jugdia is a village and a gram panchayat within the jurisdiction of the Magrahat police station in the Magrahat II CD block in the Diamond Harbour subdivision of the South 24 Parganas district in the Indian state of West Bengal.

History 
Kasimbazar and Jugdia in the eighteenth century offer a fascinating glimpse into the world of the South Asian merchants as well as the organization of the textile trade in Bengal. The East India Company determined on a course of sustained expansion of its import of raw silk from Bengal, particularly from the region of Kasimbazar. A new dimension was added to this conflict when the Mughal made Bengal a Mughal Province. After Kasimbazar and Jugdia conflicts destroyed the both textile based by the East India Company. Ananta Manik of Bhalwa frequently enlisted Arakanese help to retain his zamindari in the face of the Mughal threat emanating from Bengal. This fight was complicated by the Portuguese presence in the area. The latter frequently acted as mercenaries in the countries of the Bay and were utilized as such by local rulers in their wars against each other.

In the eighteenth century Jugdia became an important market for cotton textiles (chiefly baftas) that were produced in the surrounding areas. Then shifts that rendered the south-east delta an active area. Means basins of Ganges river in South 24 Parganas district. At the beginning of the eighteenth century, an ancestor of Munshi Hazi Desarat Molla and Munshi Chamcham Molla fled from Jugdia of Kasimbazar area in undivided Bengal under the Murshidabad region and settled in the basin of the Ganges river in South 24 Parganas district. They named the village Jugdia. They gradually spread education and Islamic culture in their own tradition. Earlier they were engaged in Munshibdar in the various parts of lower Bengal, especially the Bay of Bengal and Island of Sunderban. Chamcham Molla was given land as Khaznader from Jaminder and Hazi Desarat as a Khaznader from Pathatnkhali island under the Gosaba police station in Sundarban area. But native village established at Jugdia under the Magrahat police station.

Geography

Demographics
As per 2011 Census of India, Jugdia had a total population of 13,579.

Transport
A short stretch of local roads link Jugdia to the State Highway 1.

Hogla railway station is located nearby.

Healthcare
Magrahat Rural Hospital, with 30 beds, at Magrahat, is the major government medical facility in the Magrahat II CD block.

References 

Villages in South 24 Parganas district